is a 2D head-to-head fighting game with 3D graphics, developed by Arika and published by Capcom. It is the third and final console installment in the Street Fighter EX series. The game was first released on March 4, 2000 in Japan and on October 26, 2000 in North America as a launch title exclusively for the PlayStation 2, making it the first game in the Street Fighter series to be released on the console. It was subsequently released in Europe on March 2, 2001.

Gameplay

Mechanics
Street Fighter EX3 features a similar gameplay system to its predecessor Street Fighter EX2 Plus with characters being able to pull off similar moves like Super Combos and Meteor Combos. However, a difference here is that the "Guard Break" system from the previous installments has been removed and replaced with a similar system called the "Surprise Blow" ("Hard Attack" in Japan), which does not use up energy stored in "super bars," although the attack can be blocked (only when standing).

Other additions are the "Critical Parade" (calling out a tag-partner to simultaneously battle your opponent for a limited time) and "Momentary Combo" (following a special attack with another). Some characters received new moves, such as Skullomania having a vertical projectile.

The core gameplay is essentially the same as previous installments. However, Street Fighter EX3 features Tag Battles, similar to Tekken Tag Tournament, allowing players to switch between characters and offering greater combination possibilities.

Modes
In Original Mode, the player can recruit a team of up to four characters that were the last to be defeated by the end of the level, and can choose the next opponent(s), as is possible in Street Fighter III. The bonus stage is a simplified version of the beat 'em up genre. In this mode, there are also missions, which the player can complete in order to gain Platinum, Gold, Silver, and Bronze trophies, which in turn unlock various features.

In Arena Mode, Dramatic Battles are possible, with 2-VS-2, 1-VS-3 (similarly to Battle 1 in Original Mode), or even 2-VS-1 (similarly to Battle 3 in Original Mode, if with a partner) with flexibility via a multitap over each character being controlled by human or computer. Original mode uses new music based on the background stage, while the VS and Team Battle modes reuse themes from earlier games, which are based on the chosen characters.

In Character Edit Mode, the player can complete a series of challenges with the new character, Ace, and earn experience points, which can then be used to obtain new Special Moves and Super Combos for Ace, which can then be applied to him to create a custom move list. A configuration example would be the Shoryuken, Sonic Boom, and Spinning Piledriver, as used by Seth in Street Fighter IV. Ace is also playable in the other available game modes.

Characters
Multiple costumes are available for each character, depending on the button used on the character in the Character Select screen.

Default characters
Ace
Ryu
Ken
Chun-Li
Guile
Zangief
Dhalsim
Blanka
Vega (Balrog in Japan)
Sakura
Doctrine Dark
Hokuto / Bloody Hokuto (Chi no Fūin Tokareta Hokuto in Japan)
Cracker Jack
Skullomania
Sharon
Nanase

Unlockable characters
M. Bison (Vega in Japan)
Sagat
Garuda
Shadow Geist
Kairi
Vulcano Rosso
Area
Pullum Purna
Darun Mister

Hidden characters
Evil Ryu (Satsui no Hadō ni Mezameta Ryū in Japan)
Bison II (Vega II in Japan)

CPU-controlled
Shin-Bison (True Vega in Japan, only playable through the use of a cheat device)

Reception

Street Fighter EX3 received generally positive reviews from gaming critics. Gamecritics gave the game 7.5/10, stating that it had "a group of pleasantly complex battlers that are very distinct in both visual and play design. Adding variety and flavor to the mix, the variances in philosophy and conceptualization are extremely refreshing", adding that the "interestingly offbeat touches are far superior to the dull and ugly side of the spectrum found in Street Fighter III."

Jeff Gerstmann of GameSpot complained that the character animation is unimproved from Street Fighter EX2 and found the frequent sound changes jarring, but liked the sound effects and the bonus touches to the gameplay such as the stage which plays during the credits. He commented, "The tag-team fighting adds a nice new element that the previous game totally lacked. EX3 may feel a bit rushed in some spots, but overall it's a fun and great-looking fighting game that won't disappoint longtime EX fans."

Chester Barber reviewed the game for Next Generation, rating it one star out of five, and stated that "The EX series has always fallen short of the quality of many of the 2D Street Fighter games. However, if you're a fan, you probably won't be able to stop yourself from checking it out."

Spong said it was "a game of skill, practice and timing", and that it had nice features and fantastic special effects. They summarised it as "one game that deserves taking a look at whether you are a fan of the series or not".

In its week of release, the game made the top 10 in the Japanese sales charts, with 207,000 copies.

Notes

2000 video games
Tag team videogames
Arika games
PlayStation 2 games
PlayStation 2-only games
Street Fighter games
Video game spin-offs
Video games developed in Japan
Video games scored by Shinji Hosoe
Video games scored by Yasuhisa Watanabe
Video games with 2.5D graphics
Fighting games
2D fighting games

ja:ストリートファイターEX